
Year 232 BC was a year of the pre-Julian Roman calendar. At the time it was known as the Year of the Consulship of Lepidus and Melleolus (or, less frequently, year 522 Ab urbe condita). The denomination 232 BC for this year has been used since the early medieval period, when the Anno Domini calendar era became the prevalent method in Europe for naming years.

Events 
 By place 

 Seleucid Empire 
 The Seleucid king Seleucus II Callinicus undertakes an expedition into the interior of Iran to try to regain Parthia, but his efforts come to nothing. According to some sources, he is even taken prisoner for several years by the Parthian king, Arsaces I. Other sources mention that he establishes a peace with Arsaces I by recognising his sovereignty over Parthia.

 Roman Republic 
 Despite the opposition of the Roman Senate and of his own father, the Roman political leader Gaius Flaminius wins the passage of a measure to distribute land among the plebeians. The Romans decide to parcel out land north of Rome (the Ager Gallicus) into small holdings for its poorer citizens whose farms have fallen into ruin during the First Punic War.

 China 
 The king of Qin, Ying Zheng, invites Prince Han Fei, a legalist philosopher and member of the Han royal family, to the Qin court. However, at the instigation of Li Si, he then has him imprisoned and executed as a threat to the state.
 The Zhao general Li Mu defeats the Qin army in the Battle of Fanwu.

 By topic 

 Philosophy 
 Following the death of his mentor, Cleanthes of Assos, Chrysippus of Soli succeeds him as the third head of the Stoic school. The many writings of Chrysippus, about the Stoic doctrines, will later earn him the title of Second Founder of Stoicism.

Births 
 Xiang Yu, Chinese rebel general against the Qin Dynasty, as well as the later nemesis of Liu Bang in the civil war of the Chu-Han contention (d. 202 BC)

Deaths 
 Ashoka, Indian emperor, who has ruled the Maurya Empire across the Indian subcontinent from 273 BC (b. 304 BC)
 Cleanthes of Assos, Stoic philosopher who has been the head of the Stoic school from 263 BC, after the death of Zeno of Citium (b. c. 301 BC)

References